Cassagnes-Bégonhès is a commune in the Aveyron department in southern France.

Geography
The Céor flows southwest through the southern part of the commune and crosses the village.

Population

See also
Communes of the Aveyron department

References

External links

 Cassagnes-Bégonhès

Communes of Aveyron
Aveyron communes articles needing translation from French Wikipedia